The 1996 edition of the Campeonato Carioca kicked off on March 10, 1996 and ended on June 30, 1996. It is the official tournament organized by FFERJ (Federação de Futebol do Estado do Rio de Janeiro, or Rio de Janeiro State Football Federation. Only clubs based in the Rio de Janeiro State are allowed to play. Twelve teams contested this edition. Flamengo won the title for the 24th time. no teams were relegated.

System
The tournament would be divided in three stages:
 Taça Guanabara: The twelve teams all played in single round-robin format against each other. 
 Taça Rio: The twelve teams all played in single round-robin format against each other.
 Finals: They were to be played in two matches between the champions of the Taças Guanabara and Rio. in case the same team won both stages, they would automatically win the title, without need for final matches.

Championship

Taça Cidade Maravilhosa
As a commemoration of the 90th anniversary of the first championship, a separate championship involving only the teams from the city of Rio de Janeiro was played.

Taça Guanabara

Taça Rio

Aggregate table
The regulation stipulated that the two bottom teams in the aggregate table would dispute a playoff against the top two teams of the Second Level.

Relegation playouts

References

Campeonato Carioca seasons
Carioca